Rumen Ivaylov Rumenov (born 7 June 1993) is a Bulgarian footballer, currently playing as a midfielder for Spartak Varna.

Career
Rumenov made his competitive first team debut for Litex Lovech against Pirin Blagoevgrad on 12 March 2011 as a substitute.

Etar Veliko Tarnovo
On 12 June 2017 he left CSKA Sofia to join the newly promoted to the Bulgarian First League team of Etar Veliko Tarnovo.

Spartak Varna
In August 2022 Rumenov joined newly promoted Spartak Varna.

Club statistics

Club

Honours

Club
Litex Lovech
 A Group: 2010–11

References

External links
Profile at Sportal

1993 births
Living people
People from Shumen
Bulgarian footballers
First Professional Football League (Bulgaria) players
PFC Litex Lovech players
PFC CSKA Sofia players
Neftochimic Burgas players
SFC Etar Veliko Tarnovo players
FC Arda Kardzhali players
PFC Spartak Varna players
Association football midfielders